Sand art may refer to:

Sand art and play, e.g. Sculpturing "building sand castles"
Sandpainting
Sand drawing
Sand mandalas, Buddhist sand paintings
Sand animation, a style of live performance art, and also to a type of animation